Lucas Longoni (born 30 June 1985) is an Italian Argentine footballer who plays for Lega Pro club Siracusa.

Biography
Born in Argentina with Italian descent, Longoni moved back to Italy to start his senior career. Longoni had played for 3 clubs in 2006–07 Serie D. In 2007–08 season he moved to Eccellenza club Aosta Valley. His goal scoring ability also made him earned a fully professional contract in 2008–09 Lega Pro Prima Divisione. However Longoni only played 4 times for Arezzo in the third highest level of Italian football.

In 2009 Longoni moved down one level to 2009–10 Lega Pro Seconda Divisione club Catanzaro. Longoni once again found his goal scoring shoes. He was the joint-second team scorer (14 goals along with Antonio Montella) behind Manolo Mosciaro (17 goals). In 2010, he moved to Triestina of 2010–11 Serie B on a free transfer (However the club also paid Rexam Kft, a Hungarian company, for €450,000). The club had deep financial crisis but Longoni neither a good signing. Longoni only played 16 times without a goal. Triestina relegated at the end of season.

In 2011 Longoni left for fellow third-tier club Siracusa. Longoni scored 7 goals in his second season in the third-tier. However, the club also bankrupted at the end of season.

On 3 January 2013 Longoni was signed by fourth-tier club Vigor Lamezia.

For the 2013-2014 season, signing with Turris; in February 2014 he moved to the Vigor Lamezia. After remaining svincolanto accords, in December 2014, with the Akragas. In the summer 2015 signing for Siracusa.

References

External links
 
 AIC.Football.it profile 

1985 births
Living people
Argentine footballers
Serie B players
S.S. Arezzo players
U.S. Catanzaro 1929 players
U.S. Triestina Calcio 1918 players
U.S. Siracusa players
Vigor Lamezia players
U.S. 1913 Seregno Calcio players
Association football forwards
Argentine expatriate footballers
Expatriate footballers in Italy
Argentine expatriate sportspeople in Italy
People from Esperanza, Santa Fe
A.C.S.D. Saluzzo players
Sportspeople from Santa Fe Province